The Voice Kids is a British television music competition to find new singing talent. The fourth series began airing on 11 July 2020, being broadcast on a weekly basis on ITV. As with the previous three series, it is hosted by Emma Willis. Danny Jones, Pixie Lott and will.i.am will return as coaches, but Jessie J has been replaced by Paloma Faith, who was also previously a coach on the adult version of the show.

Due to the COVID-19 pandemic, the pre-recorded episodes - featuring the auditions, battle rounds and semi-final - were filmed a few weeks before the nationwide lockdown in March 2020. On 7 August 2020, it was announced that the final would be pre-recorded on 22 August 2020 and broadcast a week later on 29 August 2020, with a virtual audience with households invited to apply to watch the episode and vote for their winner. Justine Afante won the competition and Pixie Lott was the winning coach, marking her third victory, becoming the only UK coach in any variation to win more than 2 seasons.

Teams
Colour key:
  Winner
  Finalist
  Eliminated in the Semi-final
  Eliminated in the Battles

Blind auditions
Colour key

Episode 1 (11 July)

Episode 2 (18 July)

Episode 3 (25 July)

Episode 4 (1 August)

Battle rounds

Colour key

Episode 1 (8 August)

Episode 2 (15 August)

Show details

Results summary
Team's colour key
 Team Will
 Team Paloma
 Team Pixie
 Team Danny

Result's colour key
 Artist received the most public votes
 Finalist
 Artist was eliminated

Semi-final (22 August)

Final (29 August)
Each artist performed a duet alongside their coach in addition to their main performance.
Group performances: The Coaches ("Praise You")
Musical guests: Clean Bandit, Mabel and 24kGoldn ("Tick Tock")

References

Voice Kids (British series 4)
2020 British television seasons